Sebastes ventricosus, the Japanese black seaperch or Japanese blueback seaperch,  is a species of marine ray-finned fish belonging to the subfamily Sebastinae, the rockfishes, part of the family Scorpaenidae. It is found in the northwestern Pacific Ocean.

Taxonomy
Sebastes ventricosus was first formally described in 18439 by the zoologists Coenraad Jacob Temminck and Hermann Schlegel with the type locality given as Nagasaki. Together with S. inermis and S. cheni these three taxa form a species complex and have been treated as a single species in the past. Some authorities place this species complex in the subgenus Mebarus. The specific name ventricosus means “potbellied or bulging", an allusion which was not explained by the authors nor is it evident what it refers to, it may be alluding to the rounded nape or possibly the ventral profile which is shown as bulging in the plate accompanying the description.

Description
Sebastes ventricosus is greenish-black on the upper body and dark silver on the lower body. The pectoral-fin has 16 rays, the anal-fin has 7–8 soft rays and there are 43-49 pored scales in the lateral line.

Distribution and habitat
Sebastes ventricosus has been recorded from Iwate and Ishikawa Prefectures south to Kyushu in Japan, and off the southern part of the Korean Peninsula. It is a marine, demersal fish.

References

External links
 
 

ventricosus
Fish of Japan
Endemic fauna of Japan
Taxa named by Coenraad Jacob Temminck
Taxa named by Hermann Schlegel
Fish described in 1843